Zaton is a village in Croatia, in the Šibenik-Knin County.It has population of 978 people (2011.).

References

Populated places in Šibenik-Knin County